BioInvent International is a Swedish clinical-stage biotech company that discovers and develops novel and first-in-class immunomodulatory antibodies for cancer therapy. The Company’s validated, proprietary F.I.R.S.T™ technology platform simultaneously identifies both targets and the antibodies that bind to them, generating many promising new drug candidates to fuel the Company’s own broad clinical development pipeline or for additional licensing and partnering. Furthermore, the company has a fully integrated, proprietary, state-of-the art manufacturing facility unit. Martin Welschof has been CEO since 2018.

References

External links
 

Pharmaceutical companies established in 1983
Pharmaceutical companies of Sweden
Life sciences industry
Companies listed on Nasdaq Stockholm